Daylesford is a spa town located in the foothills of the Great Dividing Range, within the Shire of Hepburn, Victoria, Australia, approximately 108 kilometres north-west of Melbourne. First established in 1852 as a gold-mining town, today Daylesford has a population of 2,548 as of the 2016 census.

As one of Australia’s few spa towns, Daylesford is a notable tourist destination. The town’s numerous spas, restaurants and galleries are popular alongside the many gardens and country-house-conversion styled bed and breakfasts.

The broader area around the town, including Hepburn Springs to the north, is known for its natural spring mineral spas and is the location of over 80 per cent of Australia's effervescent mineral water reserve.

It is also the filming location for the third season of The Saddle Club, and scenes from the 2004 film Love's Brother.

History

Prior to European settlement the area was occupied by the Djadja Wurrung people. Pastoralists occupied the Jim Crow and Upper Loddon districts following white settlement in 1838. A farming protectorate was established at Franklinford, but was short-lived and by 1863 most of the survivors had been moved to Corranderk station at Healesville. In 1848, Irish immigrant John Egan took up land on the future town site then known as Wombat Flat. He and a party of searchers found alluvial gold in 1851 on ground now covered by Lake Daylesford initiating the local gold rush. Other finds quickly followed. With the finding of alluvial gold a town site was surveyed and founded in 1852. Between 1851, and when Daylesford was declared a municipality and formed its first Council in 1859. The population had risen to approximately 7000 Men and women of all nationalities came to this town of muddy-streets and numerous hotels. Initially called Wombat, it was renamed Daylesford. Agricultural activity quickly followed the miners, and many Chinese miners quickly turned to market gardening. The early Europeans, particularly Italians, established vineyards.

In 1859, around 3400 diggers were on the local diggings. The post office opened on 1 February 1858  and a telegraph office was opened in August 1859. Daylesford was declared a municipality in 1859 and a borough in the early 1860s.

On 30 June 1867, three boys from Connells Gully, near Table Hill (William Graham, 6, his brother Thomas, 4, and Alfred Burman, 5) wandered into the bush near Daylesford. Despite exhaustive searches, their skeletal remains were finally located (when a boot was found by a farmer's dog) on 13 September about 10 kilometres away. Today, there is a park, a memorial cairn, and a 16km long "Lost Children's Walk" that visitors can hike. The Daylesford Primary School also has a prize, the Graham Dux Award, presented to annually since 1889, in their memory.

By the 1860s, the alluvial gold was exhausted and a shift to quartz reef mining began. This continued on and off into the 1930s. In later years, Daylesford became associated as being a fashionable spa resort, but fell out of favour in the Great Depression.

The Daylesford Magistrates' Court closed on 1 January 1990.

Climate

Economy

With 65 mineral springs, the Daylesford-Hepburn Springs region accounts for more than 80 per cent of Australia’s known mineral water springs. As a result, the region has a number of spa developments including Hepburn Bathhouse & Spa, Mineral Spa at Peppers Springs Retreat and Salus Spa, Lake House. The town is also known for hosting a number of annual events, including the ChillOut Festival held during the Victorian Labour Day long weekend in March each year, the largest LGBTQ festival in rural and regional Australia; the Harvest Week Festival; the Lavandula's Festivals; and the Hepburn Springs Swiss Italian Festival celebrating the town's Swiss-Italian heritage. The annual Daylesford Highland Gathering features pipes and drums, a street march, dancing, Scottish Clans, Scottish clubs, stores et. al.

Major industries in the economy of Daylesford today are healthcare, accommodation and food, and retail trade respectively.

Education

The town is served by a number of primary schools and one public secondary school, Daylesford Secondary College. The town's Secondary College was originally established as a mining school, in 1890. In 1961 the college was established as the sole provider of secondary education in the Shire of Hepburn and has just over 500 pupils. Daylesford Primary School, formerly known as Daylesford State School, is the oldest and longest-running provider of primary education in Daylesford. Other primary schools in the area include St. Michael's Primary School and Daylesford Dharma School. Daylesford Primary School is host to an annual book fair which first started in 2010 and has since begun operating as an annual book fair, where used and unwanted books are donated to raise funds that go towards improving children's literacy.

Transport

The Midland Highway runs directly through the town linking it with Castlemaine in the north and Ballarat in the south-west. The Western Freeway is the main route linking Daylesford to the state capital.

The railway to the town closed in 1978. The railway layout at Daylesford station was unusual in that the lines from Creswick and Carlsruhe both entered the station from the same end. The Daylesford Spa Country Railway currently operates a Sunday tourist service to Musk and Bullarto along the line towards Carlsruhe.

Sport
The town has an Australian Rules football team competing in the Central Highlands Football League.
Daylesford is also home to the Daylesford and Hepburn United Soccer Club, also known as the Saints or the Sainters. The Saints have won four league titles in their 20-year history along with two cup finals.

Notable people
 David Allison (Australian politician)
 Keith Bradbury - Politician
 David Bromley - (born 1960), artist, worked in Daylesford
 (Lord) Sebastian Ulick Browne - 12th Marquess of Sligo
 Peter Corrigan - Architect
 Josh Cowan - AFL Footballer
 Bessie Lee Cowie - Temperance campaigner
 Charlie Foletta - VFL Footballer
 Joseph Furphy - Novelist
 Jack Gervasoni - VFL Footballer
 Chris Grant (footballer) - AFL Footballer
 Geraldine Hakewill - Actress
 Lynda Heaven - Politician
 (captain) John Stuart Hepburn - early pastoralist and landholder
 Merv Hobbs - AFL Footballer
 Simon Holmes à Court - Entrepreneur and Founder of Climate 200
 Sir Charles Hotham - Governor of Victoria 
 George Raymond Johnson - Architect (designed The Daylesford Town Hall)
 Samuel Johnson (actor) - Actor and Radio Presenter
 Michael Leunig - Cartoonist
 Peter Loney - Politician
 Cecily Maude O'Connell trade unionist and religious social worker
 Charlie Pannam (footballer, born 1874)
 Ambrose McCarthy Patterson - painter and printmaker
 Alfred Cecil Rowlandson - Publisher
 Edward Russell (trade unionist) - Trade Unionist
 Jack Stevens - Major General (Australian Army)
 Eugene von Guerard - Painter
 Karl von Möller - Film Director and Cinematographer (15 Daly Street until 2012)

 Ferdinand von Mueller - Botanist
 Abigail Wehrung - Basketball Player
 Carl Willis (Australian sportsman)
 Mark Leonard Winter - Actor

Gallery

References

Sources
 Daylesford Advocate, Mercury, Express, Mercury-Express. 1859-1870

External links

 

 Information Centre/ Official regional government tourism site. - Daylesford tourism
 Daylesford - Visit Victoria tourism
 Daylesford Historical Society – History of Daylesford

Towns in Victoria (Australia)
Mining towns in Victoria (Australia)
Populated places established in 1852
1852 establishments in Australia
Spa towns in Australia
Tourist attractions in Victoria (Australia)